Or Tokayev, also known as Svetlana Tokayev, Svetlana Or Tokaev, and Or Tokaev, (born November 9, 1979) is an Israeli former Olympic rhythmic gymnast.

Early life
She was born in Russia. She immigrated to Israel when she was 14 years old, in 1991.

Rhythmic Gymnastics career
Her sports club was Sport Laam.

In 1994, she came in 10th in the European Rhythmic Gymnastics Championships in Team Rhythmic Gymnastics.

She came in 14th in the 1999 World Rhythmic Gymnastics Championships.

She competed for Israel at the 2000 Summer Olympics in Sydney, Australia, when she was 20 was years old in Rhythmic Gymnastics—Women's Individual, and came in 14th.

References

External links
 

Gymnasts at the 2000 Summer Olympics
Living people
1979 births
Israeli rhythmic gymnasts
Olympic gymnasts of Israel
Russian emigrants to Israel